Shivedale School is an Indian co-educational senior secondary school in Haridwar, Uttrakhand. It is affiliated to the Central Board of Secondary Education (C.B.S.E).

It is situated in Jagjeetpur, beside the Laksar road.

History
Shivedale School was established in 2000 by Swami Sharad Puri ji at Kankhal in Haridwar, Uttrakhand. In the Year 2016, The construction for the fourth floor began.

References

External links
 

High schools and secondary schools in Uttarakhand
Buildings and structures in Haridwar
Educational institutions established in 2000
2000 establishments in Uttarakhand